The city of Lucas do Rio Verde (in English, "Lucas of the Green River") is located in the Brazilian state of Mato Grosso, 220 miles north of the state capital, Cuiabá. It has an area of 3,660 km² and a population of 67,620, many of whom are of German and Italian descent. Lucas do Rio Verde is one of Brazil's major agricultural cities (soybeans, corn, cotton). The city is served by Bom Futuro Airport.

References

 
Municipalities in Mato Grosso